The CBU-87 Combined Effects Munition (CEM) is a cluster bomb used by the United States Air Force, developed by Aerojet General/Honeywell and introduced in 1986 to replace the earlier cluster bombs used in the Vietnam War. CBU stands for Cluster Bomb Unit. When the CBU-87 is used in conjunction with the Wind Corrected Munitions Dispenser guidance tail kit, it becomes much more accurate, and is designated CBU-103.

The basic CBU-87 is designed to be dropped from an aircraft at any altitude and any air speed. It is a free-falling bomb and relies on the aircraft to aim it before it drops; once dropped it needs no further instruction, as opposed to guided munitions or smart bombs. The bomb can be dropped by a variety of modern-day aircraft. The price is US$14,000 per bomb.

Each CBU-87 consists of an SUU-65B canister, a fuze with 12 time delay options and 202 submunitions (or bomblets) designated BLU-97/B Combined Effects Bomb. Each bomblet is a yellow cylinder with a length of 20 centimeters and a diameter of 6 centimeters. The BLU-97/B bomblets are designed to be used against armor, personnel and soft skinned targets and consist of a shaped charge, a scored steel fragmentation case and a zirconium ring for incendiary effects. The CBU-87 can also be equipped with an optional FZU-39/B proximity sensor with 10 altitude selections.

When dropped from an aircraft, the bomb starts spinning. There are 6 speeds that can adjust the bomb's rate of spin. After it drops to a certain altitude, the canister breaks open and the submunitions are released. Each bomblet has a ring of tabs at the tail end, these orient the bomblet and deploy an inflatable decelerator to decrease the falling speed of the bomblet. When the submunitions hit the ground, they will cover a large area and the CBU-87 can be adjusted so it can cover a smaller or wider area. Depending on the rate of spin and the altitude at which the canister opens, it can cover an area between 20×20 meters (low release altitude and a slow rate of spin) to 120×240 meters (high release altitude and a high rate of spin).

Manufacturers and the Department of Defense have claimed that each bomb's failure rate is about 5%. This equates to about 10 bomblets not exploding on impact of the 202 bomblets dropped. Landmine Action claimed the failure rate of the BLU-97/Bs used in the Kosovo campaign was higher, between 7 and 8 percent.

Operational use
During Operation Desert Storm, the US Air Force dropped 10,035 CBU-87s. During Operation Allied Force, the US dropped about 1,100 cluster bombs, mostly CBU-87s.

On 7 May 1999, a CBU-87 was used in one of the most serious incidents involving civilian deaths and cluster bombs, the Niš cluster bombing.

References

Bibliography 
"Equipment guide." Military.com. 25 Mar 2007
Vipers in the Storm, "Weapons Bunker." 25 Mar 2007

External links
 CBU-87/B Combined Effects Munitions (CEM) - Global Security

Aerial bombs of the United States
Cluster munition
Explosive weapons
Military equipment introduced in the 1980s